Ordem do Vulcão (Portuguese for the Order of Vulcan or Order of the Volcano), also named as the Medal of the 1st Class of Ordem do Vulcão is a national award that is done each year by the President of Cape Verde, it is awarded to the greatest personalities of Cape Verde and non-Cape Verdeans, which contributes to an aggrandizement of the nation.  It is the main decoration of the country created after the independence of the nation.

Ranks
It has the following ranks:
  Medal of the 1st Rank
  Medal of the 2nd Rank
  Medal of the 3rd Rank

Recipients
Eugénio Tavares, 1995
João Lopes Filho, 2004
Amélia da Lomba, 2005 - the first non-Cape Verdean to be awarded
Cesária Évora, 2006
Mário Lúcio Sousa, 2006
Edite Borges, 2011
Gil Semedo, 2011

References

National symbols of Cape Verde
African awards